Papua New Guinea made its Commonwealth Games début in the 1962 British Empire and Commonwealth Games in Perth, Western Australia. The country has competed in 15 editions of the Games, 

Since 1962, Papua New Guinea have won a total of 14 medals in 5 sports. Weightlifting has been the most successful sport with 7 medals followed by Boxing with 3, Lawn bowls with 2, Swimming with 2, and Shooting with 1 medal.

Medals
After the 2018 Commonwealth Games, Papua New Guinea ranks 26th on the All-time Commonwealth Games medal table.

List of gold medallists

Games Summary

Notable achievements
First medal
Kenneth Hopkins won Papua New Guinea's first ever Commonwealth Games medal in Boxing during the nation's debut commonwealth games in 1962. It was a bronze medal in the men's 71 kg category.

First gold medal
Geua Tau won the country's first Commonwealth games gold by defeating New Zealand's Millie Khan 25-18 in lawn bowls for the women's singles event at the 1990 Commonwealth Games.

Most gold medals
Steven Kari has won the most gold medals for Papua New Guinea in Weightlifting. Kari has won 2 gold medals both in successive games in 2014, and 2018.

Most medals
Dika Toua is the country's most decorated athlete at the Commonwealth games with 3 medals (1 gold and 2 silvers) in Weightlifting. The weightlifter won gold in 2014 and silver medals 1 in 2006 and the other in 2018.

References

External links
 Papua New Guinea Olympic Committee & Commonwealth Games Association
 

 
Papua New Guinea and the Commonwealth of Nations
Nations at the Commonwealth Games